Claudio Edgar Benetti (born 16 February 1971 in Córdoba, Argentina) is an Argentine former footballer who played as a midfielder for clubs in Argentina, Chile, Peru and the United States.

Honours
 Boca Juniors 
 Argentine Primera División: Torneo Apertura 1992

References
 
 Profile at En una Baldosa 
 Profile at Fútbol XXI  

1971 births
Living people
Argentine footballers
Argentine expatriate footballers
Boca Juniors footballers
Nueva Chicago footballers
Club Atlético Belgrano footballers
Deportes Temuco footballers
FBC Melgar footballers
FC Dallas players
Chilean Primera División players
Argentine Primera División players
Major League Soccer players
Expatriate footballers in Chile
Expatriate footballers in Peru
Expatriate soccer players in the United States
Estudiantes de Río Cuarto footballers
Association football midfielders
Footballers from Córdoba, Argentina